Limerick Suburban Rail are a group of Iarnród Éireann commuter train services from Limerick Colbert to various other destinations on three different lines.
 Limerick – Ennis, calling at Sixmilebridge
 Limerick – Nenagh, calling at Castleconnell and Birdhill
 Limerick – Limerick Junction

Limerick to Ennis

The Limerick to Ennis suburban service runs over the southernmost  of the former Waterford, Limerick and Western Railway(WL&WR) track between Limerick and the junction with the Dublin–Galway mainline at Athenry. In the 2016 timetable, nine services per weekday are operated from Limerick to Ennis and vice versa, five and four of each being stops made by Limerick-Galway InterCity trains respectively. Sunday service is eight trains from Limerick to Ennis and nine trains from Ennis to Limerick, and similarly four trains per direction are Limerick-Galway InterCity services. Services are timetabled for a 40-minute duration.

Passenger services on this section ceased in 1976 but were re-introduced in 1988 as far as Ennis and were increased progressively until a full six-weekday service was begun in 1994 which also had a limited Sunday service. A further expansion to eight services per weekday was begun in 2003 with the timetable further reorganised in March 2010 to incorporate the newly reopened track north of Ennis and services between Limerick and Galway. Iarnród Éireann proposed that its timetable revision in 2011 would include an extra train from Galway to Ennis to meet an existing Limerick–Ennis–Limerick train to create a sixth service per direction per weekday between Limerick and Galway.

These railcars normally operate in sets of two, offering 85 seats but platform lengths will allow between one and four such cars to operate together. The signalling system on this line only allows one train operating in the section at a time, but a passing loop is planned for the section's only intermediate halt at Sixmilebridge, which would permit trains to depart from Ennis and from Limerick at about the same time and pass each other within the limits of the loop track.

Limerick to Nenagh Commuter Line

The Limerick Colbert to  Nenagh commuter rail line operates over a short section of the Limerick – Limerick Junction line before joining the Limerick–Ballybrophy railway line at Killonan Junction, County Limerick. 

As of 2021, Monday to Saturday services included two trains to Limerick Colbert (3 trains Mon - Fri), and two trains to Ballybrophy. Sunday services included one train to Limerick Colbert and one to Ballybrophy.

There is significant criticism from communities living along the line in Nenagh, Birdhill and Castleconnell of the service currently provided. The timetable does not work for workers and students trying to get to Limerick Colbert or Dublin Heuston in time to get to work during office hours or for third level college/university timetables.

This service normally operates in a block section where trains cannot operate at the same time but changes were made at Nenagh to allow the first Limerick–Ballybrophy train of the day to split there, with the front half continuing to Cloughjordan, Roscrea and Ballybrophy to meet the Dublin–Cork mainline and the back half turning back for Limerick forming the commuter service.

There are five services, three inbound and two outbound, per weekday between Limerick and Nenagh, four of which continue to or from Ballybrophy. As of 2016, there is only one inbound service to Limerick Colbert Railway Station in the morning timetabled to arrive at 08:45 and one evening outbound at 17:50. Journey time is timetabled at between 55 and 68 minutes.

The service is operated by 2800 Class diesel railcars, whose  top speeds are sufficient for the 60 mph limits between Limerick and Killonan Junction but is hampered by the condition of the track between Killonan Junction and Nenagh.

Limerick to Limerick Junction

This service is principally a shuttle along part of the Limerick–Rosslare railway line between Limerick station and Limerick Junction connecting to and from mainline services between Dublin and Cork as well as to a regional service to Waterford. In the late 2000s, an enhanced commuter aspect was developed involving expansion of car parking at Limerick Junction was completed and in 2010 Iarnród Éireann also introduced a morning service from Thurles to Limerick from Monday to Friday which passes through Limerick Junction.

There are no intermediate stops on the   Limerick Junction–Killonan Junction section or the   Killonan Junction–Limerick section.  Some services are part of direct Dublin–Limerick intercity trains operating using 22000 Class InterCity diesel railcars and the others operate using 2800 Class diesel railcars. Journey time is between 25 and 36 minutes in the 2016 timetable.

As of 2016, commuting from east of Limerick Junction was hampered by the arrangement where the train arriving from Cahir, Clonmel and Waterford at 09:00 does not proceed onward to Limerick and a shuttle train to Limerick does not depart until 09:40.

See also
 Belfast Suburban Rail
 Dublin Suburban Rail
 Cork Suburban Rail
 Galway Suburban Rail
 Rail transport in Ireland

References

External links
 Limerick-Ennis / Ennis-Limerick train times
 Limerick-Nenagh / Nenagh-Limerick train times
 Limerick-Limerick Junction-Waterford train times, retrieved 13 March 2011
 Iarnrod Eireann Network Statement 2011, retrieved 13 March 2011
 Timetable Alterations: Valid From 13 December 2010, retrieved 13 March 2011
 New Public Consultation Process for Rail Timetable Changes, retrieved 13 March 2011 onward link to timetable PDF broken
 Speeds to be increased on Nenagh to Limerick line (Nenagh Guardian 08/01/2011), retrieved 13 March 2011
 Irish Railway News Forum: Evening Limerick to Nenagh Service Often Returns Empty From Birdhill, retrieved 13 March 2011

Rail transport in the Republic of Ireland
Limerick (city)